The 2021 Indiana Fever season was the franchise's 22nd season in the Women's National Basketball Association (WNBA).  The regular season tipped off on May 14, 2021 at the New York Liberty.

The Fever started the season by losing four games before winning their first game on May 23.  The team then went on a twelve game losing streak, which included going 0–8 during the month of June.  However, before the Olympic break, the Fever won three straight games, to end the first portion of the season with a 4–16 record.  They lost the first two games in August coming out of the Olympic break, but won two of the next three.  The Fever could not maintain that momentum in the final month of the season, finishing 0–7 in September.  Their final record of 6–26 matched their win total from last year's shortened season.  Their .188 winning percentage was the third lowest in franchise history, only ahead of the 2018 season and 2022.  This was the third time in four years the team finished with only 6 wins.

Transactions

WNBA Draft 

The Fever made the following selections in the 2021 WNBA Draft:

Trades and roster changes

Roster

Game log

Preseason

|- style="background:#cfc;"
| 1
| May 9
| Chicago
| W 82–65
| T. MitchellPerry (16)
| Teaira McCowan (12)
| Tiffany Mitchell (4)
| Bankers Life FieldhouseNo Fans
| 1–0
|- style="background:#fcc;"
| 2
| May 11
| @ Chicago
| L 70–83
| Victoria Vivians (15)
| Teaira McCowan (6)
| Chelsey Perry (4)
| Wintrust ArenaNo Fans
| 1–1

Regular season

|- style="background:#fcc;"
| 1
| May 14
| @ New York
| L 87–90
| Kelsey Mitchell (23)
| Teaira McCowan (16)
| Danielle Robinson (4)
| Barclays Center1,139
| 0–1
|- style="background:#fcc;"
| 2
| May 16
| New York
| L 65–73
| Kelsey Mitchell (16)
| Jantel Lavender (15)
| Danielle Robinson (5)
| Bankers Life FieldhouseNo Fans
| 0–2
|- style="background:#fcc;"
| 3
| May 19
| @ Connecticut
| L 67–88
| Danielle Robinson (12)
| Teaira McCowan (6)
| Danielle Robinson (3)
| Mohegan Sun Arena2,084
| 0–3
|- style="background:#fcc;"
| 4
| May 21
| Atlanta
| L 79–83
| Kelsey Mitchell (19)
| Jessica Breland (16)
| Tiffany Mitchell (6)
| Bankers Life FieldhouseNo Fans
| 0–4
|- style="background:#cfc;"
| 5
| May 23
| Washington
| W 89–77
| Kelsey Mitchell (18)
| BrelandMcCowan (10)
| Danielle Robinson (6)
| Bankers Life FieldhouseNo Fans
| 1–4
|- style="background:#fcc;"
| 6
| May 25
| Washington
| L 69–85
| Tiffany Mitchell (11)
| BrelandMcCowan (7)
| Jessica Breland (5)
| Bankers Life FieldhouseNo Fans
| 1–5
|- style="background:#fcc;"
| 7
| May 28
| @ Las Vegas
| L 77–113
| Tiffany Mitchell (17)
| Teaira McCowan (10)
| K. MitchellRobinson (4)
| Michelob Ultra ArenaNo Fans
| 1–6
|- style="background:#fcc;"
| 8
| May 30
| @ Las Vegas
| L 78–101
| Victoria Vivians (17)
| Teaira McCowan (9)
| AllenBreland (4)
| Michelob Ultra Arena1,981
| 1–7

|- style="background:#fcc;"
| 9
| June 1
| @ Seattle
| L 73–88
| BrelandMcCowan (12)
| Teaira McCowan (14)
| Lindsay Allen (6)
| Angel of the Winds Arena1,215
| 1–8
|- style="background:#fcc;"
| 10
| June 3
| @ Los Angeles
| L 63–98
| Kelsey Mitchell (15)
| Danielle Robinson (8)
| Kelsey Mitchell (5)
| Los Angeles Convention Center301
| 1–9
|- style="background:#fcc;"
| 11
| June 9
| @ Chicago
| L 76–92
| Kelsey Mitchell (24)
| Jessica Breland (9)
| Jessica Breland (6)
| Wintrust Arena1,090
| 1–10
|- style="background:#fcc;"
| 12
| June 12
| Chicago
| L 79–83
| Teaira McCowan (20)
| Teaira McCowan (13)
| Lindsay Allen (6)
| Indiana Farmers ColiseumNo Fans
| 1–11
|- style="background:#fcc;"
| 13
| June 15
| Seattle
| L 70–87
| Kelsey Mitchell (26)
| Jessica Breland (9)
| K. MitchellT. Mitchell (4)
| Indiana Farmers ColiseumNo Fans
| 1–12
|- style="background:#fcc;"
| 14
| June 17
| Seattle
| L 69–79
| Teaira McCowan (13)
| Jessica Breland (11)
| Kelsey Mitchell (4)
| Indiana Farmers ColiseumNo Fans
| 1–13
|- style="background:#fcc;"
| 15
| June 19
| @ Washington
| L 77–82
| Danielle Robinson (19)
| Jessica Breland (10)
| Danielle Robinson (6)
| Entertainment and Sports Arena2,100
| 1–14
|- style="background:#fcc;"
| 16
| June 24
| Dallas
| L 64–89
| Kelsey Mitchell (24)
| Jessica Breland (7)
| Danielle Robinson (4)
| Indiana Farmers ColiseumNo Fans
| 1–15

|- style="background:#fcc;"
| 17
| July 1
| Connecticut
| L 80–86
| Kelsey Mitchell (21)
| Teaira McCowan (8)
| Danielle Robinson (7)
| Indiana Farmers ColiseumNo Fans
| 1–16
|- style="background:#cfc;"
| 18
| July 3
| Connecticut
| W 73–67
| Danielle Robinson (19)
| Teaira McCowan (12)
| T. MitchellRobinson (2)
| Indiana Farmers ColiseumNo Fans
| 2–16
|- style="background:#cfc;"
| 19
| July 9
| New York
| W 82–69
| Kelsey Mitchell (20)
| Teaira McCowan (9)
| T. MitchellRobinson (5)
| Indiana Farmers ColiseumNo Fans
| 3–16
|- style="background:#cfc;"
| 20
| July 11
| @ Atlanta
| W 79–68
| Teaira McCowan (21)
| Teaira McCowan (14)
| Danielle Robinson (9)
| Gateway Center Arena1,897
| 4–16

|- style="background:#fcc;"
| 21
| August 15
| @ Los Angeles
| L 70–75
| Kelsey Mitchell (20)
| Jessica Breland (8)
| Tiffany Mitchell (3)
| Staples Center2,029
| 4–17
|- style="background:#fcc;"
| 22
| August 17
| @ Phoenix
| L 80–84
| Kelsey Mitchell (20)
| Teaira McCowan (10)
| K. MitchellRobinsonVivians (3)
| Phoenix Suns Arena4,089
| 4–18
|- style="background:#cfc;"
| 23
| August 20
| @ Dallas
| W 83–81
| Danielle Robinson (18)
| McCowanVivians (6)
| AllenRobinson (5)
| College Park Center2,017
| 5–18
|- style="background:#fcc;"
| 24
| August 28
| Las Vegas
| L 71–87
| K. MitchellT. Mitchell (15)
| Teaira McCowan (13)
| Teaira McCowan (7)
| Indiana Farmers ColiseumN/A
| 5–19
|- style="background:#cfc;"
| 25
| August 31
| Los Angeles
| W 74–72
| Kelsey Mitchell (25)
| Teaira McCowan (19)
| AllenBrelandK. MitchellVivians (2)
| Indiana Farmers ColiseumN/A
| 6–19

|- style="background:#fcc;"
| 26
| September 4
| Phoenix
| L 65–87
| Kelsey Mitchell (18)
| BrelandMcCowan (8)
| Lindsay Allen (3)
| Indiana Farmers ColiseumN/A
| 6–20
|- style="background:#fcc;"
| 27
| September 6
| Phoenix
| L 81–86
| Kelsey Mitchell (23)
| Teaira McCowan (15)
| Lindsay Allen (7)
| Indiana Farmers ColiseumN/A
| 6–21
|- style="background:#fcc;"
| 28
| September 10
| @ Minnesota
| L 72–89
| Tiffany Mitchell (16)
| LavenderMcCowan (9)
| Lindsay Allen (6)
| Target Center3,503
| 6–22
|- style="background:#fcc;"
| 29
| September 12
| @ Minnesota
| L 80–90
| Kelsey Mitchell (25)
| Teaira McCowan (8)
| Victoria Vivians (7)
| Target Center3,434
| 6–23
|- style="background:#fcc;"
| 30
| September 14
| @ Atlanta
| L 78–85
| Kelsey Mitchell (18)
| Teaira McCowan (14)
| AllenCannon (5)
| Gateway Center Arena1,208
| 6–24
|- style="background:#fcc;"
| 31
| September 17
| Minnesota
| L 73–92
| Kelsey Mitchell (26)
| Teaira McCowan (12)
| Lindsay Allen (7)
| Indiana Farmers ColiseumN/A
| 6–25
|- style="background:#fcc;"
| 32
| September 19
| @ Chicago
| L 87–98
| Kelsey Mitchell (32)
| Teaira McCowan (9)
| Lindsay Allen (10)
| Wintrust ArenaN/A
| 6–26

Standings

Awards and honors

Statistics

Regular Season

Source:

References

External links 
 Official website of the Indiana Fever

2021 WNBA season
2021
2021 in sports in Indiana